North Billerica station is an MBTA Commuter Rail station in Billerica, Massachusetts. It serves the Lowell Line, and is located in the North Billerica village. The depot building, built in 1867, was renovated, expanded, and returned to station use in 1998. The station has mini-high platforms for accessibility.

History

Billerica Mills station – later North Billerica – was open by 1838.

The depot was completely renovated in 1998.  It served as a flag stop on the Boston and Lowell Railroad's main line and was the north terminal of the narrow gauge Billerica and Bedford Railroad (B&B).

In 1998, the North Billerica Depot underwent extensive renovations as part of the Massachusetts Bay Transportation Authority's efforts to restore and expand its Billerica commuter rail stop. The new depot and train station were rededicated on October 30, 1998.

On January 23, 2015, several people were injured when the retractable edge of the outbound platform collapsed while passengers were deboarding. Both mini-high platforms were taken out of service for a number of months, with portable lifts used until the mini-high platforms were returned to service.

References

External links

 MBTA - North Billerica
 Station from Google Maps Street View

Stations along Boston and Maine Railroad lines
MBTA Commuter Rail stations in Middlesex County, Massachusetts
Buildings and structures in Billerica, Massachusetts
Railway stations in the United States opened in 1867